In theatre, a platform (also referred to as a riser or rostrum) is a stationary, standard flat walking surface for actors to perform on. Typically, they are built to be assembled modularly. They are often used to provide varying levels, to make  a show more visually interesting. They are also used to separate areas on stage, and as seating bleachers. This is in contrast to scenery wagons, which are mobile platforms that are supported by casters instead of feet.

Construction
Platforms are composed of a frame, a lid, and legs.

Lids
Lids are typically made from a sheet of plywood, although oriented strand board is also sometimes used. Sometimes another layer is added on top of the plywood. Hardboard is sometimes used as an easily replaceable and sturdy cover. Homasote is sometimes used because it is quiet and more comfortable to walk on. Occasionally, a layer of muslin is added on top of these materials, as it takes paint better than other options.

Framing
Framing is most commonly made of nominally 2"x4" lumber or rectangular steel tubing, oriented so that its longer dimension is vertical, perpendicular to the lid. Framing is usually arranged to be at or near every edge of the lid. In addition, intermediate members (sometimes called toggles) are added. Common rules of thumb dictate that the lid should not overhang the framing by more than three inches, and that internal framing should be two feet or less apart.

Legs
Wooden framed platforms usually use 2x6 legs, which rest just inside of the framing, under the lid, with a cleat which supports the framing. Steel framed platforms are often  built with brackets to affix legs made of steel pipe. When large numbers of platforms are being used together, a stud wall is assembled to support seams between platforms, instead of using legs at all.

Other
Often, platforms that are kept in stock have coffin locks inset in their framing or lids, in order to fasten them to adjacent platforms. The legs or stud walls that support the platform typically require diagonal cross bracing, often made of very thin lumber.

Stock usage 

Many theatres maintain a 'stock' collection of platforming, which can be reused in any show. 4'x8' platforms are most common, although 6'x4' and 4'x4' are also quite common. These theatres also maintain standard sized legs, and often stair units which reach their standard height platforms.

See also 
 Stage
 Rake

Scenic design
Stage terminology